Derlis Aníbal Cardozo (born 16 June 1981) is a Paraguayan football defender.

Career 
On 23 January 2009 Olimpia de Asunçion 27-year-old wingback, will play on loan for one year for Argentinos Juniors.

Cardozo started his career in Cerro Porteño PF of Presidente Franco before playing for other Paraguayan clubs such as Sportivo Luqueño, 2 de Mayo, Libertad and Olimpia.

Titles

References

External links
 

1981 births
Living people
Paraguayan footballers
Paraguayan expatriate footballers
Sportivo Luqueño players
Club Libertad footballers
Club Olimpia footballers
Argentinos Juniors footballers
Unión de Santa Fe footballers
Argentine Primera División players
Expatriate footballers in Argentina
Association football defenders
Paraguay international footballers